Juan Nicholas V. "Nico" Elorde  (born 4 October 1991) is a Filipino professional basketball player for the GenSan Warriors of the Maharlika Pilipinas Basketball League (MPBL).

Early life
Nico is third the son of Johnny Elorde, a boxing promoter in the Philippines and the grandson of Gabriel Elorde. His two older brothers Juan Martin Elorde and Juan Miguel Elorde are both professional boxers.

Although their family is well known in the boxing community and he was introduced to boxing by the age of four, instead, Nico chose to play basketball to be different from his brothers' chosen sporting careers.

College career
Elorde attended De La Salle Zobel during his high school days and decided to play for the De La Salle Green Archers. However, Elorde decided to transfer La Salle's archrival Ateneo de Manila University because of lack of playing time in his freshman year and the school's recruitment of more point guards, leading to his getting cut from the team. Elorde had to serve a one-year residency rule of the UAAP and finally suited up for the Blue Eagles in the 2012 season.

College statistics

UAAP
College basketball career statistics of Nico Elorde.

Regular season

|-
|style="text-align:left; background:#afe6ba;" "text-align:left;"|2012-13†
|style="text-align:left;"|
|14||14.1||41.9||36.4||62.5||2||1||.1||.1||3.2

|-
|style="text-align:left;"|2013-14
|style="text-align:left;"|
|14||18.2||28.9||30.3||80.9||3.1||2.1||.5||.1||6.6

|-
|style="text-align:left;"|2014-15
|style="text-align:left;"|
|14||29.8||29||19.4||87.2||3.9||3.7||.9||.2||7.9

|-
|- class="sortbottom"
|style="text-align:center;" colspan=2|Career
|42||20.7||30.8||26.3||79.7||3||2.3||.5||.1||5.9
|- class="sortbottom"

Playoffs

|-
|style="text-align:left;"|2014-15
|style="text-align:left;"|
|2||32.7||46.2||42.9||83.3||3||4.5||1.5||0||10

|-
|- class="sortbottom"
|style="text-align:center;" colspan=2|Career
|2||32.7||46.2||42.9||83.3||3||4.5||1.5||0||10
|- class="sortbottom"

Professional career
On August 23, 2015, Elorde was drafted by the Alaska Aces with their 33rd pick, however, he was left unsigned by Alaska.

In September 2015, Elorde was reported to be practicing with the Mahindra Enforcers, a team owned and coached by boxing champion Manny Pacquiao, and raised the possibility of an Elorde-Pacquiao back-court tandem, where both names are popular in the sport of boxing with Pacquiao being one of the best boxers at the time, and Elorde, whose grandfather Gabriel was a very popular boxer in the 60s and 70s and was considered one of the best boxers ever. However, that eventually was shelved as Elorde was sent to Mahindra's ABL affiliate Pacquiao Powervit Pilipinas Aguilas (now the Pilipinas MX3 Kings), another team owned by Pacquiao.

In March 2016, after the 2015–16 ABL season ended, Elorde was signed by Mahindra for the 2016 PBA Commissioner's Cup.

PBA career statistics

As of the end of 2021 season

Season-by-season averages
 
|-
| align=left | 
| align="left" rowspan="2" | Mahindra / Kia
| 11 ||	8.7 || .273 || .000 || .778 || 1.4 || 1.0 || .1 || .0 || 1.7
|-
| align=left | 
| 23 ||	15.3 || .269 || .356 || .833 || 1.7 || 2.3 || .9 || .0 || 4.2
|-
| align=left | 
| align="left" rowspan="4" | GlobalPort / NorthPort
| 34 ||	22.7 || .306 || .231 || .733 || 3.1 || 3.3 || 1.1 || .0 || 5.3
|-
| align=left | 
| 39 || 22.7 || .328 || .267 || .794 || 2.8 || 3.7 || .8 || .0 || 6.0
|-
| align=left | 
| 11 ||	20.4 || .339 || .250 || .722 || 2.7 || 2.6 || .5 || .0 || 5.3
|-
| align=left | 
| 17 ||	8.9 || .333 || .357 || .600 || 1.5 || .9 || .1 || .0 || 2.2
|-class=sortbottom
| align=center colspan=2 | Career
| 135 || 18.3 || .311 || .268 || .755 || 2.4|| 2.7 || .7 || .0 || 4.6

Awards and honors
 UAAP Season 75 Men's Basketball Champion

Personal life
Nico married to TV host & sports reporter Mich Del Carmen in 2019 & they have a child..

References

1991 births
Living people
ASEAN Basketball League players
Basketball players from Metro Manila
Terrafirma Dyip players
Filipino men's basketball players
NorthPort Batang Pier players
People from Parañaque
Point guards
Ateneo Blue Eagles men's basketball players
De La Salle Green Archers basketball players
Alaska Aces (PBA) draft picks
Maharlika Pilipinas Basketball League players